Bangesal is both a town and Pyuthan District, Nepal's southernmost Village Development Committee; also Pyuthan's lowest in elevation.  This VDC is in the Siwalik hills north of Deukhuri Valley.

Except for a few hectares exceeding 1,000 metres elevation, Bangesal falls into Nepal's upper tropical climate zone.

Villages in VDC

References
  Damodar Pokhrel. Bangesal,2 (Tal) Pyuthan Nepal.

External links
UN map of VDC boundaries, water features and roads in Pyuthan District

Populated places in Pyuthan District